The Piaggio P.7, also known as the Piaggio-Pegna P.c.7, was an Italian racing seaplane designed and built by Piaggio for the 1929 Schneider Trophy race.

Design and development

Seeking to avoid the aerodynamic drag induced by floats in seaplanes of floatplane design, Ing Giovanni Pegna of the Piaggio company designed a very unusual seaplane to represent Italy in the 1929 Schneider Trophy race. A cantilever shoulder-wing monoplane, known both as the Piaggio P.7 and the Piaggio-Pegna P.c.7, his design floated up to its wings on its long, slender, watertight fuselage with the wings resting on the water, and employed twin high-incidence hydrofoils to get itself off the water during takeoff runs.

The engine was connected both to a two-bladed automatic variable-pitch tractor propeller by a long metal shaft and by another shaft to a smaller marine propeller, similar to those used on motorboats, mounted beneath the aircraft's tail. To take off, the pilot would start the engine with the flight propeller feathered and the normal carburettor air intake closed and use a clutch to engage the tail propeller and get the aircraft moving through the water. The two hydrofoils, mounted beneath the fuselage on struts just forward of the wings similar to the way in which floats were mounted on floatplanes, would cause the P.7 to rise out of the water almost immediately. After the aircraft had risen on its hydrofoils and the flight propeller had cleared the water, the pilot would open the carburettor air intake, again employing the clutch to disengage the marine propeller, and use another clutch to engage the flight propeller, which automatically would switch from feathered to flight pitch. Driven by its flight propeller, the aircraft then would engage in a conventional takeoff, riding on its submerged hydrofoils until it reached takeoff speed.

Without the aerodynamic drag induced by floats or the weight they added to the aircraft, Pegna projected that the P.7 would reach high speeds. Sources differ on the speeds he predicted, claiming both 580 km/h (360 mph) and 700 km/h (434.7 mph).

Testing

Piaggio manufactured one P.7 and turned it over to the Italian Schneider Trophy racing team.  Although some pilots refused to fly the aircraft, the Italian Schneider teams Tommaso Dal Molin conducted some water tests on Lake Garda in northern Italy. The spray the hydroplanes generated made it difficult to see during takeoff, and persistent problems with both clutches ensued. The aircraft never became airborne.

Not ready in time, the P.7 was excluded from the 1929 Schneider Trophy race, in which a Macchi M.52R and two Macchi M.67 seaplanes represented Italy. Piaggio and Pegna abandoned plans to build a second P.7.

Operators

Specifications

See also

Notes

References

Vašiček, Radko. "When Seaplanes Ruled the Sky." Aviation History, September 2002.

P.007
1920s Italian sport aircraft
Hydrofoil aircraft
Racing aircraft
Schneider Trophy
Single-engined tractor aircraft
Shoulder-wing aircraft